Frank Carrel (7 September 1870 — 30 July 1940) was a Canadian journalist, publisher, and politician.

In 1918, he was appointed to the Legislative Council of Quebec for Golfe. A Liberal, he served until his death in 1940.

He was buried at Mount Hermon Cemetery in Sillery, on 1 August 1940.

References

External links
 
 

1870 births
1940 deaths
Politicians from Quebec City
Quebec Liberal Party MLCs
Burials at Mount Hermon Cemetery